George Thomas Thomson (26 November 1856 – 31 October 1899) was an English rugby union footballer who played in the 1870s and 1880s. He played at representative level for England, and Yorkshire, and at club level for Halifax, in the forwards, e.g. front row, lock, or back row. Prior to Tuesday 27 August 1895, Halifax was a rugby union club.

Background
George Thomson was born in Skircoat, Halifax, West Riding of Yorkshire, and he died in Sydney, Australia.

Playing career

International honours
George Thomson won caps for England while at Halifax in 1878 against Scotland, in 1882 against Ireland, Scotland, and Wales, in 1883 against Ireland, and Scotland, in 1884 against Ireland, and Scotland, and in 1885 against Ireland.

In the early years of rugby football the goal was to score goals, and a try had zero value, but it provided the opportunity to try at goal, and convert the try to a goal with an unopposed kick at the goal posts. The point values of both the try and goal have varied over time, and in the early years footballers could "score" a try, without scoring any points.

Honoured at Halifax RLFC
George Thomson is a Halifax RLFC Hall of Fame inductee.

References

External links
Search for "Thomson" at rugbyleagueproject.org

1856 births
1899 deaths
England international rugby union players
English rugby union players
Halifax R.L.F.C. players
Rugby union forwards
Rugby union players from Halifax, West Yorkshire
Yorkshire County RFU players